Drohiczany  is a village in the administrative district of Gmina Uchanie, within Hrubieszów County, Lublin Voivodeship, in eastern Poland.

References

Drohiczany